These are the results round-by-round for the Rugby-Bundesliga in 2008-09.

Bundesliga results

Key

Round 1

Round 2

Round 3

Round 4

Round 5

Round 6

Round 7

Round 8

Round 9

Round 10

Round 11

Round 12

Round 13

Round 14

Round 15

Round 16

Round 17

Round 18

 1 The DRC Hannover canceled the game, it was awarded to SC 1880 Frankfurt.

Promotion/relegation play-off

Relegation match

 The DRC Hannover canceled the game on 18 April 2009 and voluntarily accepted relegation to the 2nd Bundesliga North/East.

Semi-finals and final

Semi-finals

Final

References

External links
 rugbyweb.de - Rugby-Bundesliga table & results  
 Rugby-Journal - Bundesliga table & results  
 Totalrugby.de - Bundesliga table & results 

results